Lohani is a Brahmin/Chhetri surname found predominantly in Nepal. Notable people with the name include:

Govind Prasad Lohani, Nepalese economist and diplomat
Indra Lohani, Nepalese lawyer and talk show host
Paresh Lohani, Nepalese cricketer
Prakash Chandra Lohani, Nepalese politician and economist
Siddhant Lohani, Nepalese cricketer
Khem Prasad Lohani, Nepali politician and a member of the House of Representatives of the federal parliament of Nepal.
Ojaraj Upadhyaya Lohani, World renowned Nepali Astrologer Pandit.
Dr Guna Raj Lohani, Senior medical doctor and Chief of Policy Planning & Monitoring Division, MoHP.
Dr Sulochan Lohani, Medical doctor and Entrepreneur. Founder of NEHCO and YDA Nepal. 
Dr. Bindu Nath Lohani, Former Vice-President of the Asian Development Bank (ADB) for Knowledge Management and Sustainable Development, Former Vice-President of the ADB for Finance and Administration, Advisor at the Institute for Integrated Development Studies, Distinguished Fellow at Emerging Market Forum, and Distinguished Adjunct Faculty at AIT (Thailand).
 Dr. Shyam Prasad Lohani, A Medical Toxicologist, Director at the Nepal Drug and Poison Information Center. Founder Academic Director at Nobel College

Nepali-language surnames